Jon Belmont is an American radio newscaster. For twenty years, he was a correspondent for ABC News Radio in New York City.  He was the morning anchor for AP Radio News in Washington, D.C. Now a retired newsie. His last dial position was at 1010 WINS Radio New York.

References 

ABC News personalities
American radio news anchors
American radio reporters and correspondents
American male journalists
Radio personalities from New York City
Radio personalities from Washington, D.C.
Year of birth missing (living people)
Living people